Donax carinatus is a species of small saltwater clam, a marine bivalve mollusc species in the family Donacidae.

Description
These shells are triangular-shaped, elongated, with a strong sculpture and anteriorly rostrated. The basic color of the external surface is purple and yellowish brown, with a purple interior.

Distribution
This species is present from Mexico to Colombia, in depths to 24 m.

References

 Coan E.V. & Kabat A.R. (2012) The malacological works and taxa of Sylvanius Hanley (1819–1899). Malacologia 55(2): 285-359.

Donacidae
Bivalves described in 1843